Mayo-Danay is a department of Far North Province, Cameroon. The department covers an area of 5,303 km and at the 2005 Census had a total population of 529,061. The capital of the department is at Yagoua.

Subdivisions
The department is divided administratively into 11 communes and in turn into villages.

Communes 

Datcheka
Gobo
Gueme
Guere    
Kai-Kai
Kalfou
Kay-Hay
Maga
Tchati-Bali
Wina
Yagoua

Villages 
 Guirvidig

References

Departments of Cameroon
Far North Region (Cameroon)